The Universe Inside is the seventh studio album by American alternative rock band The Dream Syndicate. It was released on April 10, 2020, under Anti-.

The first single from the album, "The Regulator", was released on February 26, 2020.

Track listing
All tracks lyrics composed by Steve Wynn; all music composed by Chris Cacavas, Dennis Duck, Jason Victor, Mark Walton, Stephen McCarthy and Steve Wynn

Personnel
The Dream Syndicate
Steve Wynn - lead vocals, guitar
Jason Victor - guitar, backing vocals
Chris Cacavas - keyboards
Mark Walton - bass guitar
Dennis Duck - drums

"Special guests"
Stephen McCarthy - electric sitar, guitar, six-string bass, pedal steel, backing vocals
Marcus Tenney - saxophone, trumpet
Johnny Hott - percussion

References

2020 albums
The Dream Syndicate albums
Albums produced by John Agnello
Anti- (record label) albums